Baskervilles are Christoph Gerozissis, Rob Keith, Stephanie Finucane and Craig Van Orsdale. Formed in New York City in 1997. They started life as the Baskervils in 1993 in Tampa, fronted by Laura Taylor. During that time, they had a self-published label called Baskervinyl Records.

History
Taylor left the band in 1997 and the remaining Baskervils moved to New York City. Inspired by the Television Personalities, Blondie, The Kinks, Love, the Left Banke and French Pop played by DJ Franco at the Vampyros Lesbos party in New York City, they altered the name to Baskervilles and turned the amplifiers down to perform high energy keyboard driven pop at low volumes. The lyrics were designed to be simple narratives and open ended romantic stories, many pertaining to New York City.

From 1997 to 2002, Baskervilles performed a handful of well received shows at the Mercury Lounge in the East Village. During that time, Baskervilles recorded 2 sessions at Mitch Easter's (Let's Active, R.E.M.) Fidelitorium studio in North Carolina and 1 session at Dubway Studios in New York City. The group made one trip outside of New York City in the summer of 2002 to perform at a museum opening at the Migros Museum in Zurich, Switzerland featuring the artwork of Yayoi Kusama and Michel Auder.

The band took a 2 year break while Stephanie had a baby. Rob Keith and Christoph Gerozissis formed a nocturnal electro group called Autoparty and put out an album called Lumlight. The first New York Baskervilles show in two years happened at Sin-e’ on November 6, 2003 to celebrate the release of a compilation on Secret Crush Records called Stamp Collecting For Beginners, featuring the Baskervilles song After Work. Secret Crush Records released the first Baskervilles album in spring of 2004 to great acclaim. The band followed up quickly by releasing the punchy new wave inspired Midnight EP in 2005 with a tour of the west coast of the United States.mike hodgen

During the second half of 2005 and early 2006, the Baskervilles were hard at work on album #3 and a video for Midnight At The Underground Club, directed by Jake Hensberry. Thanks to a great deal of enthusiasm from Sweden, the Baskervilles delayed work on album #3 to write a 4 song EP for Kitty Litter Records, however somewhere along the line, the deal fell through, which led to 'Twilight 14', a 14-month-long free song giveaway, the songs of 'Twilight 14' were distributed monthly with cover artwork, they could be downloaded from the official Baskervilles website in MP3 format, and promotional postcards were sent out to fans through snail mail.  The release date for the Baskervilles Twilight CD was June 3, 2008.

Discography

Baskervilles - 2004 - 10 tracks 
Released on Secret Crush Records
produced by Mitch Easter (tracks 5,7,8,9,10) and Al Houghton (tracks 1,2,3,4 and 6)

After Work 
John Riley And The Housewives Who Love Him
Have You Seen The Ideal? 
This Was The Weekend 
Opening On Thompson 
The Pages Of Lisa, Bright And Dark
Day One, Amada Year 
A Free Show In Battery Park
Anthem For The Acquaintances
That Is The Scene (Baskervilles Vs Autoparty)

Midnight EP - 2005 - 7 tracks 
Released on Secret Crush Records produced by Rob Keith

Midnight At The Underground Club
I Danced With Kate Moss
Black Boots (Pt.2) 
It Can Happen To You 
Another Free Show In Battery Park
Pictures Of You
La Grande Illusion

Twilight 14 - 2008 - 14 tracks 

produced by Mitch Easter and Rob Keith

A Little More Time
Daylight To Twilight
Smash
Caught In A Crosswalk
Everybody Looks, Not Everybody Finds
Slip A Little and boom!
Staying There For A While
Have You Seen Them?
It's A Red Fade That Leaves In A Warm Way
Where Did My Summer Go?
Sweet And Sour
Make Me Smile (Come Up And See Me)
Moves
The Apartment

Baskervilles Side Project - Autoparty 
During the short break Baskervilles had, members Rob Keith and Christoph Gerozissis formed a separate band and wrote another album of ambient electropop, their band was called 'Autoparty' and they released a 10 track album titled 'Lumlight' in 2004. 'Lumlight' like 'Baskervilles' CDs also saw wide distribution, however it was mostly purchased on CBbaby at a low price of $5. 'Autoparty' was mostly responsible for track 10 'That Is The Scene' on Baskervilles debut self-titled album, however they got Stephanie Finucane (a member of Baskervilles) to sing on it and so named it 'Baskervilles vs Autoparty'.

Lumlight - 2004 - 10 tracks
Released on
Lumlight
Je Je Boom
Nick Is In A Crawl
The First Song Was Lumlight
You Are Next
You
From the Pool To The Bar
Motel
Easy Wonderful
The Sound Of Women

External links 
 Archive of Baskervilles.net Official Website
 Baskervilles Official MySpace Page
 ErasingClouds interview with Baskervilles
 Baskervilles 'Midnight At The Underground Club' Music Video
 Indiepop.it Interview with Baskervilles
 KEXP 90.3FM Baskervilles live performance

Musical groups established in 1997